Henrik Malmström (born August 26, 1978 in Kristianstad) is a retired Swedish professional ice hockey forward who last played for Sparta Warriors of the GET-ligaen in Norway.

Malmström began his career in the Swedish HockeyAllsvenskan, the country's second tier league, playing for his hometown team Kristianstads IK before moving to the Elitserien with Malmö Redhawks where he spent four seasons.  He had a brief spell with HV71 in 2002 before returning to Malmö.  In 2003, he moved to Brynäs IF and stayed with the team until 2006 when he joined Frölunda HC midway through the 2006-07 season.  In 2007, he moved in Finland to play in the SM-liiga for Ilves and also had a brief spell with HK Acroni Jesenice of the Erste Bank Eishockey Liga.

External links

1978 births
Brynäs IF players
Frölunda HC players
HK Acroni Jesenice players
HV71 players
Ilves players
Living people
Malmö Redhawks players
Sparta Warriors players
Swedish ice hockey right wingers
Swedish expatriate ice hockey players in Norway
Swedish expatriate ice hockey players in Finland
Swedish expatriate sportspeople in Slovenia
People from Kristianstad Municipality
Sportspeople from Skåne County